Hope Is a Thing With Feathers is the fifth and final album by the alternative country band Trailer Bride. Its title bears a strong resemblance to the first line and title of a poem by Emily Dickinson, "Hope" is the thing with feathers.

Reviews
Mojo Magazine (December 1, 2003): 
"3 stars out of 5 - [T]here's a mix of twisted folk rock, recalling a less skeletal Palace and early-Nick-Cave-in-a-cowboy-hat rock."

Track listing
All songs written by Melissa Swingle except noted.
 "Silk Hope Road" - 3:03   
 "Hope is a Thing with Feathers" (Emily Dickinson, Daryl White) - 3:15   
 "Skinny White Girl" - 4:47   
 "Mach 1" (Melissa Swingle, Daryl White) - 2:18   
 "Destiny" - 3:59   
 "Lightning" - 3:37   
 "Vagabond Motel" - 5:07   
 "Quickstep" - 3:11   
 "Shiloh" - 3:46   
 "Drive with the Wind" - 2:45   
 "Waking Dream" - 3:13   
 "Mockingbird" - 3:34

Personnel
 Tim Barnes - guitar 
 John Bowman - drums, tambourine
 Melissa Swingle - vocals, accordion, guitar, harmonica, organ, piano, saw
 Daryl White - bass, bow

ADDITIONAL PERSONNEL
 Mary Huff - harmony vocals

2003 albums
Trailer Bride albums
Bloodshot Records albums